CKJX-FM, branded as Rock 104, is a Canadian radio station, broadcasting a mainstream rock format at 104.5 FM in Olds, Alberta.

History
The station owned by CAB-K Broadcasting Ltd. received CRTC approval on June 4, 2007 to operate a new FM radio station at Olds, Alberta.

CKJX began broadcasting on May 30, 2008 playing rock music from the 1960s to today.

References

External links 
Rock 104
 

Kjx
Kjx
Radio stations established in 2008
2008 establishments in Alberta